The 2010 Winnipeg Blue Bombers season was the 53rd season for the team in the Canadian Football League and their 78th overall. The Blue Bombers finished the year in 4th place in the East Division with a 4–14 record and failed to make the playoffs. The team clinched their third consecutive losing season on October 2, 2010 and were eliminated from post-season contention on Oct 23, 2010 making this the second consecutive season that they have missed the playoffs.

After their Week 18 loss against the Edmonton Eskimos, the 2010 Blue Bombers set a CFL record for most losses by four points or less in one season with a remarkable eight such losses. This sets the record after the 1993 Ottawa Rough Riders had seven such losses during their season and when the BC Lions also had seven of these losses in 1996. After losing the final game of the season against the Stampeders, the Blue Bombers finished the year losing nine games by four points or less and ten by a touchdown or less.

Offseason

CFL draft

Preseason

Regular season

Season standings

Season schedule

Roster

Roster

Player stats

Passing

Rushing

Receiving

Defence

Awards and records

2010 CFL All-Stars
RB – Fred Reid, CFL All-Star
WR – Terrence Edwards, CFL All-Star
DL – Doug Brown, CFL All-Star
DE – Phillip Hunt, CFL All-Star

CFL Eastern All-Stars
RB – Fred Reid, CFL Eastern All-Star
WR – Terrence Edwards, CFL All-Star
OG – Brendon LaBatte, CFL All-Star
DT – Doug Brown, CFL All-Star
DE – Phillip Hunt, CFL All-Star
CB – Jovon Johnson, CFL All-Star
P – Mike Renaud, CFL All-Star

Playoffs
After finishing last in the East division, the Blue Bombers failed to qualify for the 2010 CFL playoffs.

References

Winnipeg Blue Bombers Season, 2010
Winnipeg Blue Bombers seasons